The 2021 FIFA Futsal World Cup was an international futsal tournament to held in Lithuania from September 12 to October 3, 2021. The 24 national teams involved in the tournament were required by FIFA to register a squad of 16 players, including three goalkeepers. Despite this, each team can only use 14 players per match.

This article lists the national futsal squads that take part in the tournament. The age listed for each player is as of September 12, 2021, the first day of the tournament, and the names of the players shown are that of the FIFA Display Names listed on the official squad document issued by FIFA.

Group A

Costa Rica
Head coach: Carlos Quirós

Kazakhstan
Head coach:  Paulo Ricardo Kaká

Lithuania
Head coach:  Yevhen Ryvkin

Venezuela
Head coach: Freddy González

Group B

Egypt
Head coach: Gehad El-Sayed

Guatemala
Head coach: Estuardo De León

RFU
Head coach: Sergei Skorovich

Uzbekistan
Head coach: Bakhodir Akhmedov

Group C

Morocco
Head coach: Hicham Dguig

Portugal
Head coach: Jorge Braz

Solomon Islands
Head coach:  Vinicius Leite de Carvalho

Thailand
Head coach: Rakphol Sainetngam

Group D

Brazil
Head coach: Marquinhos Xavier

Czech Republic
Head coach: Tomáš Neumann

Panama
Head coach:  José Manuel Botana

Vietnam
Head coach: Phạm Minh Giang

Group E

Angola
Head coach: Rui Sampaio

Japan
Head coach:  Bruno García

The final squad was announced on 25 August 2021.

Paraguay
Head coach: Carlos Chilavert

Spain
Head coach: Fede Vidal

Group F

Argentina
Head coach: Matías Lucuix

Iran
Head coach: Mohammad Nazemasharieh

Serbia
Head coach: Dejan Maješ

United States
Head coach:  Dušan Jakica

The final squad was announced on 1 September 2021.

References

External links
 Official website
 All Teams Rosters

2021 FIFA Futsal World Cup
FIFA Futsal World Cup squads